The Doll Factory is an upcoming period thriller television series based on the novel of the same name by Elizabeth Macneal, adapted by Charley Miles for Paramount+.

Cast

Production
In July 2022, it was announced the UK wing Paramount+ had commissioned a six-part adaptation of Macneal's novel from Buccaneer Media, with Shinawil handling local production in Ireland. Charley Miles would adapt the novel, and Sacha Polak would direct the series.

The cast was announced in November 2022, with Esmé Creed-Miles set to lead the series alongside Éanna Hardwicke, Mirren Mack, and George Webster. Also joining the series were Pippa Haywood, Sharlene Whyte, Reece Kenwyne-Mpudzi, Freddy Carter, Saoirse-Monica Jackson, Laurie Kynaston, Jim Caesar, Akshay Khanna, Aysha Kala, and Nell Hudson.

Principal photography was underway in and around Dublin as of November 2022. Filming was reported at Trinity College Dublin in January 2023, specifically in the Museum Building and the Physics Lecture Theatre.

References

External links
 

Upcoming television series
English-language television shows
British thriller television series
Paramount+ original programming
Television series set in the 1850s
Television shows based on British novels
Television shows filmed in the Republic of Ireland